AD 38 (XXXVIII) was a common year starting on Wednesday (link will display the full calendar) of the Julian calendar. At the time, it was known as the Year of the Consulship of Iulianus and Asprenas (or, less frequently, year 791 Ab urbe condita). The denomination AD 38 for this year has been used since the early medieval period, when the Anno Domini calendar era became the prevalent method in Europe for naming years.

Events

By place

Roman Empire 
 Claudius and Messalina are most likely married at this point in time.
 Apion heads a deputation to Emperor Caligula, to complain about the Jews in Alexandria.
 An anti-Jewish riot breaks out in Alexandria, during a visit by King Herod Agrippa I; the mob wants to place statues of Caligula in every synagogue.

China 
An epidemic breaks out in K'aui-chi, causing many deaths. Imperial official Ch'ung-li I provides medicines that save many lives.

By topic

Arts and sciences 
 Phaedrus writes his popular collection of fables.

Religion 
 Paul meets Peter and James in Jerusalem (approximate date) (After 3 years "from his vision on the road to Damascus " went to Jerusalem to meet Peter and stayed 15 days with him.(Epistle to Galatians chapter a 18)
 Stachys the Apostle becomes the second patriarch of Constantinople.

Births 
 Drusilla, Jewish princess and daughter of Herod Agrippa I (d. AD 79)
 Drusilla, princess of Mauretania
 Julius Archelaus Antiochus, prince of Commagene (d. AD 92)
 Lucius Calpurnius Piso Licinianus, Roman co-emperor (d. AD 69)
 Marcus Valerius Martialis, Roman Latin poet (approximate date)

Deaths 
 June 10 – Julia Drusilla, sister of Caligula (b. AD 16)
 Archelaus of Cilicia, Roman client king
 Du Shi, Chinese inventor and politician
 Ennia Thrasylla, Roman noblewoman
 Naevius Sutorius Macro, Roman prefect (b. 21 BC)
 Rhoemetalces II, Roman client king
 Tiberius Gemellus, grandson of Tiberius (b. AD 19)
 Tiberius Julius Aspurgus, Roman client king

References 

0038

als:30er#38